Ariadne Paraskevi Spanaki (born 13 March 2001) is a Greek sailor. She competed with Emilia Tsoulfa in the women's 470 event at the 2020 Summer Olympics.

References

External links
 
 
 

2001 births
Living people
Greek female sailors (sport)
Olympic sailors of Greece
Sailors at the 2020 Summer Olympics – 470
Sportspeople from Thessaloniki